Baccio Ciarpi (1574–1654) was an Italian painter of the late-Mannerism and early-Baroque style. Born in Barga in Tuscany, he was active in Rome and Florence. He is best known for having mentored briefly Pietro da Cortona. He painted a number of canvases, including a Madonna del Rosario and Crucifixion with Saints, for the Pieve di Santa Maria in Barga. In Rome, there are paintings by him in Santa Maria della Concezione dei Cappuccini, San Silvestro in Capite and Santa Lucia in Selci.

References

1574 births
1654 deaths
Artists from the Province of Lucca
16th-century Italian painters
Italian male painters
17th-century Italian painters
Italian Baroque painters
People from Barga, Tuscany